Butler Public Library may refer to:

Butler Public Library, a branch of the Pine Mountain Regional Library System
Butler Library, located on the Morningside Heights campus of Columbia University